Georgios Printezis (alternate spelling: Giorgos) (born February 22, 1985) is a Greek former professional basketball player, who spent the majority of his pro club career with Olympiacos Piraeus of the Greek Basket League and the EuroLeague. Printezis won back-to-back EuroLeague titles with Olympiacos in 2012 and 2013. His game-winning shot against the Russian club CSKA Moscow, at the end of the 2012 EuroLeague Final, off an assist from Vassilis Spanoulis, is one of the all-time highlights in the history of the EuroLeague.

Printezis earned an All-EuroLeague First Team selection in 2017. While representing the senior Greek national team, Printezis was instrumental in Greece's bronze medal run at the 2009 EuroBasket.

Professional career

Early years
For the 2006–07 season, Printezis was loaned by Olympiacos to Olympia Larissa, of the Greek League. With Olympia Larissa, he averaged 11.5 points and 3.9 rebounds per game. At the Greek All-Star Game weekend that season, he won the slam dunk competition. At the end of that season, he was also voted the Greek League Best Young Player. Following that success, he returned to Olympiacos.

Málaga
In 2009, Printezis signed a 3-year contract with an NBA escape clause after the second year, worth €3.6 million euros net income, with the Spanish ACB League club Unicaja Málaga.

Return to Olympiacos
On April 27, 2011, Printezis returned to his previous club, Olympiacos Piraeus, after being transferred from Málaga. In the EuroLeague's 2011–12 season's Final, Printezis hit a game-winning shot, off an assist from Vassilis Spanoulis, with .7 seconds remaining on the game clock, to give Olympiacos the EuroLeague championship, with a victory over the Russian VTB United League club CSKA Moscow.

On July 12, 2012, Printezis signed a new three-year contract with Olympiacos. Prior to signing that contract, he had considered signing a three-year, 4.5 million US dollars net income contract offer from the Turkish Super League club Fenerbahçe Ülker, but he chose to stay with Olympiacos instead. With Olympiacos, he also won the 2012–13 season championship of the EuroLeague. On July 8, 2014, he extended his contract with Olympiacos until 2017.

On June 14, 2017, Printezis signed a three-year contract extension with Olympiacos. He signed a one-year extension with the team on June 16, 2020. On July 15, 2021, Olympiacos announced that Printezis had agreed to another one-year contract extension with the club. 

On June 17, 2022, Printezis officially announced his retirement from playing professional club basketball, after winning the Greek Basket League championship of the 2021–22 season with Olympiacos. During his final season with the Reds, he served as the team's captain.

NBA draft rights
Printezis was selected by the San Antonio Spurs, in the second round, with the 58th selection overall of the 2007 NBA draft. The draft rights to Printezis were then acquired by the Toronto Raptors, in exchange for their second round draft pick in the 2008 NBA draft (the Spurs used that pick to draft Goran Dragić, and immediately traded Dragić to the Phoenix Suns, in order to acquire the draft pick they used in 2009 to draft future NBA All-Rookie Second Team member DeJuan Blair). On January 20, 2011, the Toronto Raptors traded Printezis' draft rights to the Dallas Mavericks, in exchange for Alexis Ajinça, a conditional 2013 second round draft pick, and cash.

On December 10, 2011, the draft rights to Printezis were traded to the New York Knicks, along with Tyson Chandler, and the draft rights to Ahmad Nivins, in a three-way trade. The Mavericks received Andy Rautins from the Knicks, and a second round pick from the Washington Wizards. The Wizards received Ronny Turiaf from the Knicks, in addition to a Dallas 2012 second round draft pick, a 2013 Knicks second round draft pick, and cash considerations.

In the summer of 2012, Printezis turned down a one-year contract offer from the Knicks, that reportedly was for slightly more than the minimum NBA salary. On July 16, 2012, his and Kostas Papanikolaou's draft rights were traded to the Portland Trail Blazers, in a deal that sent Raymond Felton to New York. On February 21, 2013, the draft rights to Printezis were subsequently traded to the Oklahoma City Thunder, in a deal that sent Eric Maynor to the Portland Trail Blazers. On July 15, 2014, Printezis' draft rights and Thabo Sefolosha, were traded to the Atlanta Hawks, in exchange for the draft rights to Sofoklis Schortsanitis, cash considerations, and a trade exception. On July 9, 2015, the draft rights to Printezis, alongside a 2017 second-round draft pick, were traded to the Spurs, in exchange for Tiago Splitter.

National team career

Greek junior national team

With the junior national teams of Greece, Printezis played at the 2001 FIBA Europe Under-16 Championship, the 2004 FIBA Europe Under-20 Championship, and the 2005 FIBA Europe Under-20 Championship.

Greek senior national team
Printezis was selected to the senior Greek national team that played at the 2008 Summer Olympics. With Greece, he won the bronze medal at the 2009 EuroBasket. 

In addition to that, Printezis was on Greece's national teams that played at the following major tournaments: the 2008 FIBA World Olympic Qualifying Tournament, the 2010 FIBA World Championship, the 2012 FIBA World Olympic Qualifying Tournament, the 2013 EuroBasket, the 2014 FIBA World Cup, the 2015 EuroBasket, the 2017 EuroBasket, and the 2019 FIBA World Cup.

Career statistics

EuroLeague

|-
| style="text-align:left;"| 2002–03
| style="text-align:left;" rowspan=6| Olympiacos
| 3 || 0 || 2.0 || .000 || .000 || .000 || .3 || .0 || .0 || .0 || .0 || .0
|-
| style="text-align:left;"| 2003–04
| 3 || 0 || .9 || 1.000 || .000 || .000 || .3 || .0 || .0 || .0 || .7 || .7
|-
| style="text-align:left;"| 2004–05
| 1 || 0 || 5.2 || .000 || .000 || .000 || .0 || .0 || .0 || .0 || .0 || -1.0
|-
| style="text-align:left;"| 2005–06
| 8 || 0 || 8.9 || .611 || .500 || .500 || 1.1 || .1 || .3 || .0 || 3.8 || 2.4
|-
| style="text-align:left;"| 2007–08
| 21 || 10 || 19.0 || .513 || .238 || .609 || 3.2 || .6 || .3 || .2 || 6.7 || 6.2
|-
| style="text-align:left;"| 2008–09
| 20 || 15 || 18.7 || .636 || .500 || .517 || 3.3 || .6 || .4 || .1 || 8.8 || 8.5
|-
| style="text-align:left;"| 2009–10
| style="text-align:left;" rowspan=2| Málaga
| 12 || 6 || 24.2 || .517 || .421 || .750 || 4.3 || .8 || .7 || .2 || 11.7 || 11.2
|-
| style="text-align:left;"| 2010–11
| 14 || 8 || 15.6 || .386 || .182 || .688 || 2.7 || .3 || .2 || .1 || 5.6 || 3.7
|-
| style="text-align:left;background:#AFE6BA;"| 2011–12†
| style="text-align:left;" rowspan=10| Olympiacos
| 21 || 4 || 21.8 || .500 || .310 || .864 || 4.1 || 1.2 || .3 || .3 || 10.6 || 11.3
|-
| style="text-align:left;background:#AFE6BA;"| 2012–13†
| 29 || 27 || 20.9 || .465 || .312 || .750 || 4.0 || 1.0 || .2 || .1 || 10.5 || 10.1
|-
| style="text-align:left;"| 2013–14
| 21 || 14 || 21.2 || .443 || .273 || .659 || 4.7 || 1.0 || .4 || .2 || 10.2 || 10.3
|-
| style="text-align:left;"| 2014–15
| 20 || 13 || 25.1 || .486 || .300 || .696 || 4.8  || 1.0 || .4 || .2 || 12.2 || 13.2
|-
| style="text-align:left;"| 2015–16
| 21 || 20 || 25.3 || .561 || .364 || .698 || 5.5 || 1.3 || .2 || .1 || 14.1 || 15.4
|-
| style="text-align:left;"| 2016–17
| 32 || 32 || 25.4 || .468 || .403 || .700 || 5.1 || 1.0 || .7 || .2 || 12.8 || 14.9
|-
| style="text-align:left;"| 2017–18
| 28 || 27 || 25.6 || .466 || .343 || .691 || 5.5 || 1.4 || .5 || .3 || 12.0 || 13.7
|-
| style="text-align:left;"| 2018–19
| 30 || 26 || 21.3 || .480 || .308 || .621  || 5.2 || 1.3 || .4 || .2 || 10.6 || 12.6
|-
| style="text-align:left;"| 2019–20
| 25 || 21 || 21.2 || .552 || .371 || 690  || 4.3 || 1.2 || .4 || .2 || 11.8 || 13.8
|-
| style="text-align:left;"| 2020–21
| 3 || 2 || 21.4 || .700 || .667 || 100  || 3.1 || 1.7 || .0 || .2 || 12.3 || 13.3
|-
| style="text-align:left;"| Career
| style="text-align:left;"|
| 312 || 225 || 22.5 || .540 ||.332 || .689 || 4.3  || 1 || 0.4 || 0.2 || 10.4 || 11.1

Awards and accomplishments

Club career 
Olympiacos Piraeus
FIBA Intercontinental Cup Champion: (2013)
2× EuroLeague Champion: (2012, 2013)
4× Greek League Champion: (2012, 2015, 2016, 2022)
2× Greek Cup Winner (2011, 2022)

Greek senior national team
2008 FIBA World OQT: 
2009 EuroBasket:

Individual 
Greek Youth All-Star Game MVP: (2006)
6× Greek League All-Star: (2007, 2008, 2013, 2014, 2018, 2019)
Greek All-Star Game Slam Dunk Champion: (2007)
Greek League Best Young Player: (2007)
Greek Cup Finals Top Scorer: (2012)
Greek League Most Improved Player: (2012)
5× Greek League Best Five: (2012, 2014, 2015, 2016, 2017)
3× EuroLeague MVP of the Round: 
EuroLeague MVP of the Month: (April 2015)
All-EuroLeague First Team: (2017)
EuroLeague 2010–20 All-Decade Team: (2020)
Olympiacos 2010–20 Team of Decade
Greek League Hall of Fame: (2022)

References

External links
Georgios Printezis at acb.com 
Georgios Printezis at draftexpress.com
Georgios Printezis at esake.gr 
Georgios Printezis at eurobasket.com
Georgios Printezis at euroleague.net

Georgios Printezis at basket.gr 

1985 births
Living people
2010 FIBA World Championship players
2014 FIBA Basketball World Cup players
2019 FIBA Basketball World Cup players
Basketball players at the 2008 Summer Olympics
Basketball players from Athens
Baloncesto Málaga players
Greek Basket League players
Greek expatriate basketball people in Spain
Greek men's basketball players
Liga ACB players
Olympia Larissa B.C. players
Olympiacos B.C. players
Olympic basketball players of Greece
Power forwards (basketball)
San Antonio Spurs draft picks